A bird dog is a dog used in hunting birds.

Bird dog may also refer to:
 Bird dog (exercise)
 Bird Dog (album), a 1987 album by The Verlaines
 "Bird Dog" (song), a 1958 song by the Everly Brothers
 Bird Dog, Cessna L-19 or Cessna O-1 Bird Dog airplane